Nebularia gourgueti  is a species of sea snail, a marine gastropod mollusc in the family Mitridae.

Description
The length of the shell attains 27.7 mm.

Distribution
This marine species occurs off Tahiti, French Polynesia.

References

(of Mitra gourgueti Poppe, Salisbury & Tagaro, 2015) Poppe G.T., Salisbury R. & Tagaro S.P. (2015). Two new Mitridae from the Central Pacific. Visaya. 4(4): 77-84 page(s): 78, pl. 3.

External links
 Fedosov A., Puillandre N., Herrmann M., Kantor Yu., Oliverio M., Dgebuadze P., Modica M.V. & Bouchet P. (2018). The collapse of Mitra: molecular systematics and morphology of the Mitridae (Gastropoda: Neogastropoda). Zoological Journal of the Linnean Society. 183(2): 253-337
 Worms Link

gourgueti